The U.S. House Committee on Armed Services, commonly known as the House Armed Services Committee or HASC, is a standing committee of the United States House of Representatives. It is responsible for funding and oversight of the Department of Defense (DoD) and the United States Armed Forces, as well as substantial portions of the Department of Energy. Its regular legislative product is the National Defense Authorization Act, which has been passed by Congress and signed into law each year since 1962.

Jurisdiction
The Armed Services Committee has jurisdiction over defense policy generally, ongoing military operations, the organization and reform of the Department of Defense and Department of Energy, counter-drug programs, acquisition and industrial base policy, technology transfer and export controls, joint interoperability, the Cooperative Threat Reduction program, Department of Energy nonproliferation programs, and detainee affairs and policy.

History

The Armed Services Committee was created by the Legislative Reorganization Act of 1946, which consolidated the functions of two predecessor committees: the Committee on Military Affairs and the Committee on Naval Affairs, which were established as standing committees in 1822. Another predecessor, the Committee on the Militia, was created in 1835 and existed until 1911 when it was abolished and its jurisdiction transferred to the Committee on Military Affairs. When Republicans took control of the House of Representatives in 1994, the committee was renamed the Committee on National Security. It was later renamed the Committee on Armed Services.

Members, 118th Congress

Resolutions electing members:  (Chair),  (Ranking Member),  (D),  (R),  (D),  (D)

Subcommittees

Historical membership rosters

114th Congress

115th Congress

116th Congress

Resolutions electing members:  (Chair),  (Ranking Member),  (D),  (R),  (D)

117th Congress

Resolutions electing members:  (Chair),  (Ranking Member),  (D),  (R),  (D),  (D)

Subcommittees

Chairmen since 1947

References

External links

 House Armed Services Committee home page
 House Armed Services Committee. Legislation activity and reports, Congress.gov.
 Congressional Directory including lists of past memberships 

1822 establishments in the United States
Civil–military relations
Armed Services
Organizations established in 1822